Gylfi Magnússon (born. 1966) is an Icelandic economist, an associate professor at University of Iceland and former chair of the Icelandic Competition Authority (Samkeppniseftirlitið). He was Minister for Economic Affairs in the coalition government of Jóhanna Sigurðardóttir. He served as Minister of Business Affairs from 1 February 2009 until 1 October the same year and then served as Minister of Economic Affairs until 2 September 2010.

Gylfi graduated from the University of Iceland in 1990, and received his doctorate from Yale in 1997. While at Yale, he was a core member of the champion intramural soccer team, The Handsome Lads. When he received his doctorate, he was already a researcher at the Institute of Economic Studies of the University of Iceland: he joined the Faculty of Economics and Business Administration as an adjunct professor in 1997, and was promoted to associate professor in 1998. He served as Head of the Department of Business Administration from 2000 to 2004, and as Dean of Faculty from 2004 to 2007.

References

External links 
Homepage at the University of Iceland
Gylfi Magnússon photographed at the protests in Reykjavik, 18 January 2009
Biography at the homepage of the Ministry of Economic Affairs

Gylfi Magnusson
Gylfi Magnusson
Living people
1966 births